Christine Darden (born September 10, 1942, as Christine Mann) is an American mathematician, data analyst, and aeronautical engineer who devoted much of her 40-year career in aerodynamics at NASA to researching supersonic flight and sonic booms. She had an M.S. in mathematics and had been teaching at Virginia State University before starting to work at the Langley Research Center in 1967. She earned a Ph.D. in engineering at George Washington University in 1983 and has published numerous articles in her field. She was the first African-American woman at NASA's Langley Research Center to be promoted to the Senior Executive Service, the top rank in the federal civil service. 

Darden is one of the researchers featured in the book Hidden Figures: The American Dream and the Untold Story of the Black Women Mathematicians Who Helped Win the Space Race (2016), a history of some of the influential African-American women mathematicians and engineers at NASA in the mid-20th century, by Margot Lee Shetterly.

In 2019, Darden was awarded the Congressional Gold Medal.

Early life and career

Christine Mann was born September 10, 1942, to schoolteacher Desma l. Cheney and insurance agent Noah Horace Mann Sr. in Monroe, North Carolina. Both parents encouraged her to pursue a quality education. Starting from age three, Darden was brought by her mother to her own classroom where she taught, and at age four, Darden was enrolled in kindergarten. During elementary school, Darden took a great interest in breaking apart and reconstructing mechanical objects like her bicycle. Darden finished her last two years of primary school at Allen High School, a boarding school in Asheville, North Carolina.

She graduated as the class valedictorian in 1958, subsequently receiving a scholarship to attend Hampton University, a historically black college then known as Hampton Institute. During her studies at Hampton, she participated in some of the early protests of the Civil Rights Movement. She participated in several student sit-ins alongside her other Black peers. Mann graduated from Hampton with a B.S. in Mathematics in 1962. She also earned a teaching certification, and taught high school mathematics for a brief time.

In 1963, Mann married Walter L. Darden Jr., a middle-school science teacher. In 1965 she became a research assistant at Virginia State College, studying aerosol physics. At Virginia State, Darden earned an M.S. in 1967 and taught mathematics there.

That same year she was hired by NASA as a data analyst at Langley Research Center. Darden started in the "computer pool", performing calculations as a computer for engineers. She began automating the process by writing computer programs.

After moving into more aeronautical research, in 1973 Darden was promoted to a position as aerospace engineer by her superior John V. Becker. She had nearly been fired earlier. Her early findings in the 1960s and 1970s resulted in a revolution of aerodynamics design to produce low-boom sonic effects. In 1983 Darden earned a Ph.D in engineering from George Washington University.

In 1989, Darden was appointed as leader of the Sonic Boom Team, a subsidiary of the High Speed Research (HSR) Program. On the Sonic Boom Team she worked on designs to decrease the negative effects of sonic booms, such as noise pollution and the depletion of the ozone layer. Her team tested new wing and nose designs for supersonic aircraft. She also designed a computer program to simulate sonic booms.

The program was canceled by the government in February 1998, "without fan fare or press announcement." 1998 abstract published by Darden describes the program as focused on "technologies needed for the development of an environmentally friendly, economically viable High-Speed Civil Transport [HSCT]." Darden wrote more than 50 articles in the general field of aeronautical design, specializing in supersonic flow and flap design, as well as the prediction and minimization of sonic booms.

NASA's "human computers" 
In 1935, the first African-American women mathematicians were hired as human computers at NASA (National Aeronautics and Space Administration), then known as NACA (National Advisory Committee for Aeronautics). Since many men were overseas fighting in World War II, more job opportunities were given to both white and African-American women. The latter computer pool became known as the "West Area Computers", in reference to their segregated office. The human computers performed calculations to support research into plane flight and, later, rockets. Because the state of Virginia, where the Langley Research Center was located, had racial segregation, Jim Crow laws were followed at the facility, which is located near Hampton. This changed after the 1964 Civil Rights Act which banned segregation.

The collective, once tasked with processing scores of collected flight test data, by the 1940s had garnered a reputation as "human computers" who were essential to NASA's operation. During the 1950s and 1960s, more of these women gained opportunities to advance as technicians and engineers.

Darden started working in the computer pool in 1967 at NASA, after she had completed an M.S. in mathematics at Virginia State University and taught there. By that time, computers were increasingly used for the complex calculations to support engineering and design. Darden left the computer pool in 1989 for a position as engineer, working on decreasing sonic boom in supersonic flight. She earned her PhD in 1983 (with the support of NASA), and became known for her research as "one of NASA's preeminent experts on supersonic flight and sonic booms." Darden was promoted as a manager, and she advanced to become the first African-American woman at Langley to be promoted into the Senior Executive Service, the top rank in the federal civil service.

In March 2007, Darden retired from NASA as director of the Office of Strategic Communication and Education.

Awards
In 1985, Darden received the Dr. A. T. Weathers Technical Achievement Award from the National Technical Association. She received a Candace Award from the National Coalition of 100 Black Women in 1987. She received three Certificates of Outstanding Performance from Langley Research Center: in 1989, 1991, and 1992.

On January 28, 2018, Darden received the Presidential Citizenship Award at Hampton University in recognition for her contribution and service".

Darden received an honorary degree from North Carolina State University on December 19, 2018.

Darden  also received an honorary degree from the George Washington University on May 19, 2019.

In 2019, Darden was awarded the Congressional Gold Medal.

She delivered the Christine Darden Lecture at MathFest 2021.

References

External links

1942 births
Living people
People from Monroe, North Carolina
American women mathematicians
American aerospace engineers
George Washington University School of Engineering and Applied Science alumni
Virginia State University alumni
Hampton University alumni
NASA people
20th-century American mathematicians
West Area Computers
Mathematicians from North Carolina
20th-century women mathematicians
Mathematicians from Virginia
Congressional Gold Medal recipients